Erupa patara is a moth in the family Crambidae. It was described by Herbert Druce in 1902. It is found in Ecuador.

References

Erupini
Moths described in 1902